Sarıkamış-Allahuekber Mountains National Park, established on October 19, 2004, is a national park in northeastern Turkey. The national park stretches over the mountain range of Allahuekber Mountains and is located on the province border of Erzurum and Kars.

The national park is of historical importance, where during the Battle of Sarikamish at the beginning of World War I about 60,000 Turkish soldiers died freezing under harsh winter conditions on the Allahuekber Mountains.

References

National parks of Turkey
Mountain ranges of Turkey
Geography of Erzurum Province
Landforms of Erzurum Province
Geography of Kars Province
Landforms of Kars Province
Tourist attractions in Erzurum Province
Tourist attractions in Kars Province
Şenkaya District
Sarıkamış District
2004 establishments in Turkey
Protected areas established in 2004
Important Bird Areas of Turkey